Scout Taylor-Compton (born Desariee Starr Compton; February 21, 1989) is an American actress. She has frequently worked in the horror genre, most notably as Laurie Strode in the 2007 remake of Halloween and its 2009 sequel. Outside of horror, she portrayed musician Lita Ford in the biographical drama film The Runaways (2010).

Life and career
Scout Taylor-Compton was born Desariee Starr Compton, on February 21, 1989, in Long Beach, California. Her mother is of Mexican ancestry. Her father is a mortician. Taylor-Compton says she "grew up in that whole horror genre and visiting my dad at the mortuary. I have no problem with that stuff. Whether it was a coffin or my dad bringing his work home." Andy Biersack from Black Veil Brides, her ex-boyfriend whom she dated, composed the song "The Mortician's Daughter" about her.

In 1998, Taylor-Compton began her acting career with an appearance in the film A.W.O.L. with David Morse, and later in the short film Thursday Afternoon. She went on to have small roles in both television and film including Ally McBeal, ER, Frasier, The Guardian and The Division. She appeared in several student films, commercials for Fuji Film and the Disney Cruise Line, and various skits on The Jay Leno Show. In November 2000, Taylor-Compton made her stage debut as the title character in a production of Annie Warbucks at The Grove Theatre in Upland, California, and a stage production of Footloose at the Simi Valley Cultural Arts Center.

In 2001, she had a recurring role as Clara Forrester, the younger sister of Dean Forrester (Jared Padalecki) in the television series Gilmore Girls, appearing in a total of four episodes until 2004. Taylor-Compton was nominated for "Best Performance in a TV Series – Recurring Young Actress" for her portrayal of Clara. She made a comedic appearance in the film Four Fingers of the Dragon (2003) playing herself auditioning for a role in a fictional Kung Fu film. In 2004, she appeared in the teen comedy, Sleepover, her first large Hollywood film role. The cast of the film was nominated for "Best Performance in a Feature Film – Young Ensemble Cast" at the Young Artists Award.

In 2005, she was briefly considered a missing person when her family had been unable to contact her for approximately two weeks. She was discovered to be alive and healthy on August 25, 2005, and had reportedly been in the company of friends during her absence.

Following Sleepover, she appeared in numerous television series including Hidden Howie, Unfabulous (2 episodes), Cold Case, That's So Raven, Charmed (appearing in 8 episodes between 2000 and 2006 as various Fairies), and Without a Trace (in which she portrayed a runaway teenager).

In 2007, Taylor-Compton joined the cast of ABC'S Friday Night Live. The same year, she starred in the drama Tomorrow is Today and the horror film Wicked Little Things. Tomorrow is Today features Taylor-Compton as Julie Peterson, a girl who saves the life of and befriends a hapless drifter. The film won over six awards at various festivals which included the California Independent Film Festival, the Garden State Film Festival, Method Fest Independent Film Festival, and the Rhode Island International Film Festival. She won "Best Actress" for her performance in the film at the Method Fest Independent Film Festival. Wicked Little Things was one of the films featured in After Dark's 8 Films to Die For and saw Taylor-Compton star as Sarah Tunny. Following these films, she appeared in Standoff and Close to Home.

In 2007, Taylor-Compton appeared in the film An American Crime which told the true story of suburban housewife Gertrude Baniszewski, who had kept a teenage girl locked in the basement of her Indiana home during the 1960s. Taylor-Compton then returned to the horror genre as Laurie Strode in Rob Zombie's remake of the classic Halloween. She endured a long audition process, but as director Zombie explains, "Scout was my first choice. There was just something about her; she had a genuine quality. She didn't seem actor-y."

She starred in the television movie Love's Unfolding Dream, which premiered on November 24, 2007, and in the horror film April Fool's Day, a remake of the 1986 film of the same name, filmed in North Carolina, that had a March 25, 2008 DVD release. Taylor-Compton explained at the time on the starring in the role of Torrance: "I'll just be playing another wholesome 'good girl' that screams a lot." She also made another horror film, the 2009 film Life Blood, in which she had a cameo as Carrie Lain.

However, in an interview conducted in July 2007, Taylor-Compton did report that after completing April Fool's Day she wanted to stay away from roles in the horror genre for her next film projects. Although she has received many horror film scripts, she believes that she "need[s] to move on from horror. Just drift away a little bit and do something else so I don't get stuck in that" and although she "love[s] doing horror films" and are her "favorite", she'd "like to do other stuff in between." She has recently been influenced by the career of Scarlett Johansson, wanting to choose scripts and roles based on personal interest as she views Johansson does. Taylor-Compton went on to explain, "That's what I kind of want to do. I love just being passionate about something rather than just caring about the money or who's in the movie." In 2009, Taylor-Compton starred alongside Helen Mirren and Joe Pesci in Love Ranch. Then she appeared in the film Obsessed alongside Beyoncé Knowles. Taylor-Compton reprised her role as Laurie Strode in Halloween II (2009), a sequel to  Rob Zombie's 2007 film.

In 2010, she appeared in The Runaways, where she played Lita Ford, alongside Kristen Stewart, Dakota Fanning and Stella Maeve.

Other work
In 2001, Taylor-Compton provided voice overs for I Am Sam, and continued with voice over work with appearances in The Core (2003) and The Princess Diaries 2: Royal Engagement (2004). The following year, she provided voice over work for the teen hero comedy Sky High. She sang the theme song "Jet Set" for the film Chicken Night (2001). In 2002, Taylor-Compton appeared briefly in the Will Smith music video for "Black Suits Comin' (Nod Ya Head)" for the Men in Black II soundtrack. She appeared in the music video for "Sweet Valentine" by the band Born the Sky in 2007.

In 2003, Taylor-Compton took vocal lessons with Diane Gillespie and Vocal Power Institute, along with guitar, drums and keyboard lessons, and joined a theatre group called "Shenanigans," where she performed and took weekly tap and jazz lessons. She attended the Hollywood Pop Academy for additional vocal training.

In 2007, Taylor-Compton released her debut rock/pop album, in which she sang and played drums. She has cited Cyndi Lauper, Gwen Stefani, Madonna, Kelly Osbourne and Green Day as her musical influences. She worked with ERA Productions and punk-pop singer Vitamin C. While on the set filming Halloween (2007), Taylor-Compton received "a few pointers" about a music career from director Rob Zombie, who had also fronted the band White Zombie. She has stated that singing is a side project and "is just a little talent that I have on the side, and if it does something then I'll do that, but I'm not gonna give up acting."

In 2011, she played in a music clip for a cover of Adele's song "Someone like You" by Tony Oller along with Lucas Till.

In 2022, she appeared in metalcore band Ice Nine Kills' music video for their song "The Shower Scene", based off the 1960 film Psycho.

Filmography

Film

Television

Video games

See also
List of solved missing person cases

References

External links
 
 MTV.com interview
 

1989 births
2000s missing person cases
20th-century American actresses
21st-century American actresses
21st-century American singers
21st-century American women singers
Actresses from Long Beach, California
American actresses of Mexican descent
American child actresses
American film actresses
American television actresses
Formerly missing people
Living people
Missing person cases in California